Water cabbage is a common name for several plants and may refer to:
Pistia, a monotypic plant genus in the family Araceae
Samolus valerandi, a species of water pimpernel